The 2018–19 Oregon Ducks women's basketball team represented the University of Oregon during the 2018–19 NCAA Division I women's basketball season. The Ducks, led by fifth-year head coach Kelly Graves, played home games at the Matthew Knight Arena as members of the Pac-12 Conference. They finished the season 33–5, 16–2 in Pac-12 play to win the Pac-12 regular season title. They advanced to the championship game of the Pac-12 women's tournament where they lost Stanford. They received an at-large bid of the NCAA women's tournament where they defeated Portland State and Indiana in the first and second rounds, South Dakota State in the Sweet Sixteen and Mississippi State in the Elite Eight to reach the Final Four for the first time in school history. They lost to Baylor in the Final Four.

Offseason

Departures

Recruits

Roster

Schedule

|-
!colspan=9 style=| Exhibition

|-
!colspan=9 style=| Non-conference regular season

|-
!colspan=9 style=| Pac-12 regular season

|-
!colspan=9 style=|Pac-12 Women's Tournament

|-
!colspan=9 style=|NCAA Women's Tournament

Rankings
2018–19 NCAA Division I women's basketball rankings

^Coaches did not release a Week 2 poll.

See also
 2018–19 Oregon Ducks men's basketball team

References

Oregon Ducks women's basketball seasons
Oregon
Oregon Ducks
Oregon Ducks
Oregon
NCAA Division I women's basketball tournament Final Four seasons